The CONIFA European Football Cup is an international football tournament organized by CONIFA, an umbrella association for states, minorities, stateless peoples and regions unaffiliated with FIFA, planned to be held every two years beginning with 2015. The 2017 edition was in Northern Cyprus.

History

Hungary 2015

In June 2014 CONIFA announced plans to organize the ConIFA European Football Cup. 3 FAs applied to host the tournament: Abkhazia, Ellan Vannin and Nagorno Karabakh. Ellan Vannin was announced as host on August 6. However, in March 2015, at the draw for the competition, the tournament was moved as a result of logistical issues; Székely Land was announced as the replacement host, with the competition to be held in Hungary.

Northern Cyprus 2017 

In January 2017 CONIFA announced that the 2017 edition of the CONIFA European Football Cup would take place in Northern Cyprus. The competition featured 8 teams, 2 more than in 2015.

Republic of Artsakh 2019 

In August 2019, ConIFA announced the 2019 edition of the CONIFA European Football Cup took place in Nagorno Karabakh and featured 12 teams, 4 more than in 2017. However, this was revised down to 8 teams following the late withdrawal of 4 teams.

County of Nice 2021 

In January 2021, ConIFA announced the 2021 edition of the CONIFA European Football Cup took place in Nice, France and featured 12 teams, 4 more than in the 2017 and 2019 editions. This was announced in a backdrop of the, at the time, ongoing COVID-19 Global Pandemic.

Northern Cyprus 2023 

In September 2022, ConIFA announced the 2023 edition of the CONIFA European Football Cup would take place in Northern Cyprus.

Results

Appearances
 Legend
  — Champions
  — Runners-up
  — Third place
  — Fourth place
 GS — Group Stage
 q — Qualified for upcoming tournament
  — Qualified but withdrew
  — Did not qualify
  — Did not enter / Withdrew / Banned / Entry not accepted by CONIFA
  — Hosts

For each tournament, the number of teams in each finals tournament (in brackets) are shown.

Members of CONIFA Europe
As of 28 October 2022

References

 
Confederation of Independent Football Associations
Non-FIFA football competitions